Cartmel is a village in Cumbria, England.

Cartmel may also refer to:

Cartmel College, a college of The University of Lancaster
Cartmel Fell, a hill, hamlet and civil parish in Cumbria, England
Cartmel Priory in the village of Cartmel
Cartmel Racecourse, a small racecourse in the English Lake District

People with the surname
Andrew Cartmel (21st century), British science-fiction writer and journalist
Neil Cartmel (born 1968), English cricketer

See also
Cartmell
Cartmel Fell, civil parish and "Outlying Fell" 7 miles north of Cartmel